The 2015 Watford Borough Council election took place on 7 May 2015 to elect members of Watford Borough Council in England. This was on the same day as other local elections.

Ward results

Callowland

Central

Holywell

Leggatts

Meridan

Nascot

Oxhey

Park

Stanborough

Tudor

Vicarage

Woodside

References

2015 English local elections
May 2015 events in the United Kingdom
2015
2010s in Hertfordshire